This is a list of Anabaptist churches and communities.

Anabaptism includes Amish, Hutterite, Mennonite, Bruderhof, Schwarzenau Brethren, River Brethren and Apostolic Christian denominations.

Some individual congregations, church buildings, or communities are individually notable, such as by being listed as historic sites.  In the United States some of these are listed on the National Register of Historic Places.  In South Dakota, a number of Hutterite colonies were considered and NRHP-listed together.

Anabaptist churches include:

In the United States

Alexanderwohl Mennonite Church, Goessel, Kansas
Alleghany Mennonite Meetinghouse, Brecknock Township, Pennsylvania, NRHP-listed
Assembly Mennonite Church, Goshen, Indiana
Bruderhof Communities, international
Bon Homme Hutterite Colony, Tabor, South Dakota, NRHP-listed
Casselton Mennonite Church, Casselton, North Dakota, built as an Episcopal church, was a Mennonite church during 1950-2002, NRHP-listed
Charity Christian Fellowship
College Mennonite Church, Goshen, Indiana
Eighth Street Mennonite Church, Goshen, Indiana
Former Reformed Mennonite Church, Williamsville, New York, NRHP-listed
Hans Herr House, West Lampeter Township, Pennsylvania
Howard-Miami Mennonite Church, Indiana
Mennonite Meetinghouse, Philadelphia, Pennsylvania, NRHP-listed
Mennoville Mennonite Church, El Reno, Oklahoma, NRHP-listed
Oak Grove Mennonite Church, Smithville, Ohio, started as an Amish church
Prairie Street Mennonite Church, Indiana
Weavertown Amish Mennonite Church, Weavertown, Pennsylvania
Yellow Creek Mennonite Church, Indiana

House Churches
Some Anabaptists, such as the Old-Order Amish, do not have a fixed place of worship but meet instead for Sunday services in rotating order, at the homes of church Elders and other prominent members of the community. Inasmuch as some in attendance have traveled relatively long distances by wagon in order to participate, it is expected that the family hosting the services will afterwards provide a hearty meal for all present with the help of other families. Weddings are also performed at the home of the bride's parents and not in a church.

References

Anabaptism
Anabaptist